Brother Studios (later renamed Crimson Sound) was the name of a recording studio located at 1454 5th St, Santa Monica, California established by brothers Brian, Dennis, and Carl Wilson, co-founders of the Beach Boys.

History
Brother Studios was named after the Beach Boys' record label, Brother Records and officially opened for public use in May 1974. The studio was functional as early as January 1974 as certain high-profile artists such as Elton John had begun using the facility. Brother Studios served as the primary recording base of the Beach Boys until it was sold to engineer Hank Cicalo and jazz musician Tom Scott in 1978 who subsequently renamed it Crimson Sound.

Sessions at Brother Studios

Notes

Recording studios in California
1974 establishments in California
The Beach Boys
The Beach Boys music